Tuna Aktürk (born 22 September 1977 in Balıkesir) is Balıkesir Vice-Mayor and Balıkesirspor President. He has a degree in civil engineering from Balıkesir University, Faculty of Engineering and Architecture.

He is the largest shareholder and board member of Veta Yapi Construction Company .

References

External links
Balikesir Mayority Web Page
Balikesirspor Web Page

1977 births
Living people
People from Balıkesir
Turkish businesspeople
Turkish football chairmen and investors
Balıkesir Lisesi alumni
Balıkesir University alumni
Turkish civil engineers
Balıkesirspor